Statistics of Bahraini Premier League for the 1990–91 season.

Overview
Muharraq Club won the championship.

References
RSSSF

Bahraini Premier League seasons
Bah
1990–91 in Bahraini football